The Diocese of Yaroslavl and Rostov is an eparchy of the Russian Orthodox Church in the area of the Yaroslavl Oblast.

History
Rostov and Suzdal diocese were founded in 991 with the center in Rostov.

The title of the ruling bishop has changed several times. In 1390 the diocese became an archdiocese. From 1711 to 1783 it was headed by Bishops and Archbishops and from 1783 to 1786 by Archbishops.

In 1786, an episcopal see was transferred from Rostov to Yaroslavl. At that time, 29 monasteries operated in the diocese.

From 1907 to 1913 the Yaroslavl diocese headed by Archbishop Tikhon (Bellavin), the future Patriarch of Moscow and All Russia. His successor was the Metropolitan Agafangel (Preobrazhensky) (glorified in 2000 as a hieroconfessor). In 1923-1926, Archbishop Joseph (Petrovykh) ran the diocese.

References

Eparchies of the Russian Orthodox Church